Andreas Fischer (born 20 October 1964 in Paderborn) is a German football coach and a former player.

Honours
 DFB-Pokal: 1992–93

References

External links
 

1964 births
Living people
German footballers
Association football midfielders
Bundesliga players
2. Bundesliga players
SC Preußen Münster players
Bayer 04 Leverkusen players
Hamburger SV players
Rot-Weiss Essen players
VfB Remscheid players
German football managers
SC Verl managers
Sportspeople from Paderborn
Footballers from North Rhine-Westphalia
West German footballers